Vincenzo Virga (born 11 September 1936 in Erice, Province of Trapani) is the boss of the Trapani Mafia family and mandamento since 1982, when the previous boss, Salvatore Minore, was murdered. Virga is currently in prison, he was sentenced to life imprisonment for ordering the Pizzolungo bombing among other crimes.

Biography
Virga was one of the trusted men of Bernardo Provenzano and considered to be his financial brain. He was one of the members of the directorate that ruled Cosa Nostra, which was established by Provenzano after the arrest of Totò Riina. It consisted of about four to seven people who met infrequently, only when necessary, when there were strategic decisions to be made. Among the other members were Salvatore Lo Piccolo; Antonino Giuffrè from Caccamo; Benedetto Spera from Belmonte Mezzagno; Salvatore Rinella from Trabia; Giuseppe Balsano from Monreale; Matteo Messina Denaro from Castelvetrano; and Andrea Manciaracina from Mazara del Vallo.

Since 1994 Virga was on the run and wanted for the murders of judge Alberto Giacomelli and the journalist Mauro Rostagno. Virga's real skill was in masterminding the intricate financial dealings of the Mafia. His strong political and social support made it hard to arrest him.

On February 21, 2001, Virga was arrested in a remote cottage near Trapani while watching a video documentary about the 1992 assassinations of the two Antimafia judges Giovanni Falcone and Paolo Borsellino and surrounded by documents detailing the award of public works contracts to firms he controlled.

"He is a magician in piloting contracts. We have caught the business brain of Bernardo Provenzano," said police chief Giuseppe Linares when Virga was arrested. Under Virga's direction, the apparently sleepy, non-descript town of Trapani, with more banks than Italian cities five times its size, became a magnet for hundreds of millions of mafia revenue, which was recycled by investing in land developments and waste disposal.

On May 15, 2007, the Appeal Court in Milan sentenced the Forza Italia Senator and Silvio Berlusconi’s right hand man Marcello Dell'Utri and Virga to two years each for attempted extortion of Trapani Basket Ball team by Publitalia, the Fininvest concessionaire. Four years later, the Appeal Court in Milan nullified the sentence and absolved Dell'Utri and Virga because there is no substance to the fact.

References

 Oliva, Ernesto & Salvo Palazzolo (2001). L’altra mafia: Biografia di Bernardo Provenzano, Soveria Mannelli (CZ): Rubbettino Editore.

External links
 

1936 births
Living people
People from Erice
Sicilian mafiosi
Italian crime bosses